Maxim Petrovich Semyonov (born 9 February 1984)  is a Kazakhstani professional ice hockey defenceman who is currently an unrestricted free agent. He most recently played for Barys Nur-Sultan in the KHL. He participated at the 2010 IIHF World Championship as a member of the Kazakhstan men's national ice hockey team.

Playing career 
Maxim Semyonov is a Kazakhstan native who got his start in big hockey as a 19-year-old skating for Lada Togliatti of the Russian Superleague during the 2003–04 season. The young player stuck in the lineup and was drafted by the Toronto Maple Leafs with the 220th overall selection of the 2004 NHL Entry Draft.

During the 2005–06 season, Semyonov moved to play for Khimik Moscow Oblast and remained with the team when it was adopted into the Kontinental Hockey League in 2008.

Following the 2012–13 season, in which he split between Atlant Moscow Oblast and Lokomotiv Yaroslavl, Semyonov returned to Kazakhstan signing with hometown KHL entrant Barys Astana on June 20, 2013.

Career statistics

Regular season and playoffs

International

References

External links 

1984 births
Asian Games gold medalists for Kazakhstan
Medalists at the 2011 Asian Winter Games
Asian Games medalists in ice hockey
Atlant Moscow Oblast players
Barys Nur-Sultan players
HC Lada Togliatti players
Kazakhstani ice hockey defencemen
Kazakhstani people of Russian descent
Living people
Lokomotiv Yaroslavl players
Nomad Astana players
Toronto Maple Leafs draft picks
Ice hockey players at the 2011 Asian Winter Games
Sportspeople from Oskemen